Shizuoka Sangyo University Football Club is a Japanese football club based in Shizuoka. The club has played in Japan Football League.

Ladies team
The SSU's women's football team, known as Iwata Bonita, was originally affiliated with Júbilo Iwata and wore their colors but now wears SSU's green uniform colors.

External links
Official site

Football clubs in Japan
1994 establishments in Japan
Japan Football League clubs
Sports teams in Shizuoka Prefecture
Association football clubs established in 1994